Elections to Midlothian Council were held in May 1988, the same day as the other Scottish local government elections.

Election results

Ward results

References

1988 Scottish local elections
1988